The 2000–01 Illinois State Redbirds men's basketball team represented Illinois State University during the 2000–01 NCAA Division I men's basketball season. The Redbirds, led by second year head coach Tom Richardson, played their home games at Redbird Arena and were a member of the Missouri Valley Conference.

The Redbirds finished the season 21–9, 12–6 in conference play to finish in a tie for second place with Bradley University. They were the number three seed for the Missouri Valley Conference tournament. They won their quarterfinal game versus the University of Evansville and lost their semifinal game versus Bradley University.

The Redbirds received an at-large bid to the 2001 National Invitation Tournament. They were defeated by Purdue University in the first round.

Roster

Schedule

|-
!colspan=9 style=|Regular Season

|-
!colspan=9 style=|State FarmMissouri Valley Conference {MVC} tournament

|-
!colspan=9 style=|National Invitation {NIT} tournament

References

Illinois State Redbirds men's basketball seasons
Illinois State
Illinois State